During the American Civil War, nearly 320,000 Ohioans served in the Union Army, more than any other Northern state except New York and Pennsylvania. Of these, 5,092 were free blacks. Ohio had the highest percentage of population enlisted in the military of any state.  Sixty percent of all the men between the ages of 18 and 45 were in the service. Ohio mustered 230 regiments of infantry and cavalry, as well as 25 light artillery batteries and 5 independent companies of sharpshooters. Total casualties among these units numbered 35,475 men, more than 10% of all the Buckeyes in uniform during the war. There were 6,835 men killed in action, including 402 officers.

Volunteer infantry regiments

Volunteer cavalry regiments

Volunteer artillery

Ohio Independent Artillery Batteries

1st Ohio Light Artillery

Battery A, 1st Ohio Light Artillery
Battery B, 1st Ohio Light Artillery
Battery C, 1st Ohio Light Artillery
Battery D, 1st Ohio Light Artillery
Battery E, 1st Ohio Light Artillery
Battery F, 1st Ohio Light Artillery
Battery G, 1st Ohio Light Artillery
Battery H, 1st Ohio Light Artillery
Battery I, 1st Ohio Light Artillery
Battery K, 1st Ohio Light Artillery
Battery L, 1st Ohio Light Artillery
Battery M, 1st Ohio Light Artillery

Ohio Heavy Artillery Regiments
1st Ohio Heavy Artillery
2nd Ohio Heavy Artillery

Other Ohio Volunteer Infantry Units
 Black Brigade of Cincinnati
 1st Battalion Ohio Sharpshooters
 1st Independent Company Sharpshooters
 2nd Independent Company Sharpshooters
 3rd Independent Company Sharpshooters
 4th Independent Company Sharpshooters
 5th Independent Company Sharpshooters
 6th Independent Company Sharpshooters
 7th Independent Company Sharpshooters [Sherman's Bodyguard]
 8th Independent Company Sharpshooters
 9th Independent Company Sharpshooters
 10th Independent Company Sharpshooters
 Captain Bard's Company
 Dennison Guards
 Trumbull Guards
 Wallace Guards
 Departmental Corps

Other Ohio Volunteer Cavalry Units
 1st Independent Battalion Cavalry, later 11th Ohio Cavalry
 2nd Independent Battalion Cavalry
 3rd Independent Battalion Cavalry
 4th Independent Battalion Cavalry
 5th Independent Battalion Cavalry
 McLaughlin's Independent Squadron Cavalry 
 Blazer's Scouts
 3rd Independent Company Cavalry
 4th Independent Company Cavalry 
 5th Independent Company Cavalry 
 6th Independent Company Cavalry
 Burdsell's Independent Company Cavalry 
 George's Independent Company Cavalry 
 Ironton Independent Company Cavalry 
 Harlan Light Cavalry 
 Union Light Guard

See also
 Lists of American Civil War Regiments by State
 Ohio in the American Civil War
 List of Ohio's American Civil War generals

Notes

References

  
 Harper, Robert S., Ohio Handbook of the Civil War. Columbus, Ohio: The Ohio Historical Society, 1961.
 
 
 
 
 
 
 
 
 
 
 
 
 
 
 U.S. War Department, The War of the Rebellion: A Compilation of the Official Records of the Union and Confederate Armies, 70 volumes in 4 series. Washington, D.C.: United States Government Printing Office, 1880–1901.

External links
Ohio in the Civil War by Larry Stevens

 
Ohio
Civil War